Famalicão may refer to:

Places
 Famalicão (Guarda), a civil parish in the municipality of Guarda
 Famalicão (Nazaré), a civil parish in the municipality of Nazaré
 Vila Nova de Famalicão Municipality, a municipality in the district of Braga

Other uses
 Famalicão, a documentary film by Manoel de Oliveira about Vila Nova de Famalicão
 F.C. Famalicão, a football club based in Vila Nova de Famalicão
 Clube Rugby Famalicão, a rugby club based in Vila Nova de Famalicão